CRMA may refer to:
 City and Regional Magazine Association
 Chulachomklao Royal Military Academy
 Civil Rights Movement Archive
Canadian Radio Music Awards